Thermoniphas kigezi is a butterfly in the family Lycaenidae. It is found in south-western Uganda and possibly Cameroon.

References

Endemic fauna of Uganda
Butterflies described in 1956
Thermoniphas